The Jack Carson Show is an American old-time radio comedy-variety program. It was broadcast on different seasons on CBS and NBC, beginning on June 2, 1943, and ending on December 20, 1956. The program was also known as The Sealtest Village Store, and the New Jack Carson Show. It was carried on the CBC Dominion network in Canada, as well. Additionally, The Jack Carson Show is the title of a television program that was broadcast on NBC from October 22, 1954, until March 11, 1955.

Premise
Comedian Jack Carson played himself in a show akin to The Jack Benny Program in the way it portrayed a comedic version of the star's home life, supplemented with music. Radio historian John Dunning described Carson's characterization on the show as "generally bumbling and dumb."

A later version of the program had Carson in the role of "a very capable m.c., bantering with his supporting cast, reading an 'off-beat' item from a newspaper and recounting a humorous incident.

Originating at KNX in Los Angeles, California, the program debuted as a summer replacement for Milton Berle's show. Sponsors over the years included Campbell Soup Company, Sanka coffee, and Sealtest.

Personnel
Besides Carson, regular characters on the show and the actors who portrayed them are shown in the table below.

Others often heard on the program included Doris Drew, Maxie Rosenbloom, Hanley Stafford, and Irene Ryan.

Announcers were Del Sharbutt, Carlton KaDell, Howard Petrie, Hy Averback, and Bob Stewart. Music was led by Ray Chamberlain, Charles Dante, Walter Gross, Freddy Martin, and Johnny Richards. Singers on the show included Olga San Juan, Tony Romano, Marion Hutton, Anita Ellis, and the King Sisters.

Bill Brennan, Vick Knight, Sam Fuller, and Larry Berns were producer-directors. Sol Stein, Tom Adair, Jack Douglas, Howard Harris, Leo Solomon, Dave Swift, Leonard Levinson, Lou Fulton, and Mack Benoff were writers. Knight and Richards collaborated to compose the program's theme song, "The Moment We Met".

Broadcast schedule
The table below gives information about when The Jack Carson Show was broadcast.

Source: On the Air: The Encyclopedia of Old-Time Radio

Note: The 1947-1948 version of the program was titled The Sealtest Village Store.

Television
In the TV version of The Jack Carson Show, Carson was host for "a program of music, songs, and comedy sketches." Sponsored by Pontiac automobiles, the show was broadcast on Friday nights on NBC, alternating with The Red Buttons Show.

Besides Carson, regular cast members included Don Ameche, Kitty Kallen, Ray McDonald, Donald Richards, Peggy Ryan, Constance Towers, and The Asia Boys. Announcers were Bud Heistand and Ed Peck. The orchestra was led by Vic Schoen and Harry Sosnik.

References

External links

Logs
Log of episodes of The Jack Carson Show from Jerry Haendiges Vintage Radio Logs
Log of episodes of The Jack Carson Show from Old Time Radio Researchers Group
Log of episodes of The Jack Carson Show from radioGOLDINdex

Streaming
Episodes of The Jack Carson Show from Dumb.com
Episodes of The Jack Carson Show from Old Radio Programs
Episodes of The Jack Carson Show from Old Time Radio Researchers Group Library

1943 radio programme debuts
1956 radio programme endings
1940s American radio programs
1950s American radio programs
CBS Radio programs
NBC radio programs
American comedy radio programs